Kiel Thomas van Vollenhoven (born 6 June 1998) is a South African cricketer. He made his first-class debut on 26 March 2021, for Northerns in the 2020–21 CSA 3-Day Provincial Cup in South Africa. He made his List A debut on 22 July 2021, for Warwickshire in the 2021 Royal London One-Day Cup in England.

References

External links
 

1998 births
Living people
South African cricketers
Northerns cricketers
Warwickshire cricketers
Place of birth missing (living people)